WTOX is a Spanish music formatted broadcast radio station licensed to Glen Allen, Virginia, serving Metro Richmond. WTOX is owned and operated by Michael Mazursky, through licensee Mobile Radio Partners, Inc.

Frequency history

1480 in the Richmond was originally used by WLEE, which had moved there from 1450 kHz in 1950 as part of a power increase. WLEE, which grew to be the main Top 40 radio station in Richmond in the 1960s and early 1970s, shared its time with an even older station, WBBL, which broadcast church services on Sunday. WLEE was shuttered December 31, 1988, for economic reasons, taking WBBL with it.

Sale
On July 14, 2015, Davidson Media Group announced it would be selling WTOX and sister station WVNZ to TBLC Virginia Holdings, LLC. for $400,000. The sale was consummated on November 5, 2015.

In late 2018, Mobile Radio Partners assumed programming control, and put its Ultra Richmond format, already heard on WULT, on WTOX. Effective June 9, 2021, Mobile Radio Partners acquired WTOX, WVNZ, and a translator from TBLC Media for $209,500.

References

External links
Ultra Richmond 1540-94.1-1480

TOX
Radio stations established in 2006
Spanish-language radio stations in the United States
2006 establishments in Virginia